Abdirashid Mohamed Ahmed is a Somali politician. He was the former Minister of Commerce and Industry from 2015 to 2017, and Minister of Petroleum and Mineral Resources from 2021 to 2022. He hails from Gendershe a sub clan from Sheikhal.

References 

21st-century Somalian politicians
Commerce and industry ministers
Government ministers of Somalia
Living people
Year of birth missing (living people)